Taamusi (ᑖᒧᓯ), Tuumasi (ᑑᒪᓯ), Tomassie and Thomassie are Inuit Christian names originally given to Inuit baptised by missionaries in Kuujjuarapik. These names are used both as first names and surnames. It is derived from English, Thomas.

Examples
Taamusi Qumaq (1914-1993), politician and writer
Tumasi Quissa (1948-), singer and song-writer
Thomassie Mangiok (1983-), graphic designer

References

Inuktitut-language names